The Sheraton Waikiki Hotel is a resort hotel in Honolulu, Hawaii on Waikiki Beach. It was built in 1971 and is currently owned by Kyo-Ya Management Company, Ltd. and operated by Marriott International. The hotel was featured in The Brady Bunch season 4 opener in 1972.

Ownership 

In 1974, Japanese brothers Kenji Osano and Masakuni Osano bought the 3 year-old Sheraton Waikiki Hotel, along with the Sheraton Maui and the Royal Hawaiian Hotel.  They already owned the Princess Kaiulani Hotel, the Moana Hotel and the Surfrider Hotel. The Osano brothers formed Kyo-Ya Company Limited, a subsidiary of Kokusai Kogyo Company Limited as the corporate entity charged with overseeing the hotel properties.  The purchases put the Osano brothers on the Forbes List of World's Richest People in 1999.  After the death of the Osano brothers, Takamasa Osano inherited the billions of dollars owned in properties.  The Sheraton Waikiki Hotel is used as the Osano corporate office. In 2004 Takamasa Osano sold 65% of Kokusai Kogyo to Cerberus Partners LP to cover $4 billion in defaulted loans. He still controls 35% of the company.

External links 
 

Waikiki
Hotels in Honolulu
Waikiki
Buildings and structures completed in 1971
Hotels established in 1971
Hotel buildings completed in 1971
1971 establishments in Hawaii
Buildings and structures in Honolulu